The Art of Peace or variation, may refer to:

 Diplomacy, the art opposite of the art of war
 Art of Peace Award, an award for an artist selected by the President's Peace Commission of St. Mary's University, San Antonio, Texas, US
 The Art of Peace (philosophy), a martial arts philosophy of Morihei Ueshiba, formulated following WWII
 The Art of Peace (2007 book), selection from works of Morihei Ueshiba
 The Art of Peace: An Illustrated Biography on Prince Iyesato Tokugawa (2019 book), by Stan S. Katz; a biography about Tokugawa Iesato
 Songs for Tibet: The Art of Peace (album), a 2008 album
 The Arts of Peace, a statue in Washington, D.C., US

See also

 The Essential Arts of Peace, a fictional sutra from the Japanese manga comic book Qwan
 Piece of art
 
 Diplomacy (disambiguation)
 The Art of War (disambiguation)
 The War of Art (disambiguation)
 Peace (disambiguation)
 Art (disambiguation)

Disambiguation pages